Pseudopolynesia amplificata is a moth in the family Geometridae. It is found on Borneo, Peninsular Malaysia and Luzon. The habitat consists of various lowland forest types, including dry heath forests.

References

Moths described in 1861
Eupitheciini